Leah Borromeo is a British journalist and filmmaker based in London, who is most known for documenting social issues. Borromeo has also directed the documentary The Cotton Film: Dirty White Gold., which is yet to be released.

Career 
Borromeo writes a regular column on sustainability and ethics for The Guardian. She has also made a series of short films on arts activism for Channel 4’s Random Acts and hosted Resonance FM’s The Left Bank Show. Borromeo has worked with Peter Kennard on several projects after she interviewed him for a book Beyond The Street. They have also worked together on several films on Syrian Crises.

In 2014, Borromeo directed the interactive film London Recruits, which highlights direct actions young Londoners in the 1960s and 1970s took against the apartheid regime in South Africa. Borromeo has also written and filmed for the Index on Censorship, The British Journal of Photography, Amnesty International, Sky News and Greenpeace.

Borromeo has a regular slot presenting arts and culture on Tariq Ali's show for TeleSUR English.

The Cotton Film 
In 2013, Borromeo started working on The Cotton Film: Dirty White Gold, which documents the epidemic of suicides amongst cotton farmers in India. The movie has two parallel narratives: one about the stories of two widows and a farmer, and then alongside that the story of a burgeoning movement, of activism within the fashion industry in the West. Borromeo started working on the movie after she went on a self-funded junket with a clothing brand to check out their supply chain for an article she was writing in 2009. While researching the article, she came across farmer suicides. She took the idea of making a film to Dartmouth Films and crowdfunded the film's production and trailer. Subsequently she used the trailer to spread the film's campaign message of supply chain transparency across the whole fashion industry.

Toronto Star called Borromeo "ballsy" and wrote that "Borromeo, in her mission to make ethics and sustainability in the fashion industry a norm, speaks to widows and pesticide peddlers to uncover the harsh truth that has been blanketing the cotton farmers in India." and Ecouterre wrote that "[the movie] follows the life of cotton from seed to store, tracing who it touches and how their live are effected. The film uncovers the real truth behind cotton, and the utter importance of buying sustainable fashion."

Controversies 
While Borromeo was protesting in a G20 campaign, she was charged with ten others on two counts of impersonating a police officer. She was following a group called Space Hijackers, who were travelling in an armoured personnel carrier adorned with toy machine guns. Borromeo later quipped that if she was guilty of impersonating anyone, it would be a stripper and not a police officer as she was wearing a boiler suit rolled down to the waist to reveal a black bra.

References 

Living people
Year of birth missing (living people)
British journalists
British columnists